Hora may refer to:

Companies
 Hora (company), a Romanian manufacturer of stringed musical instruments

People
 Hora (surname)
 Hora (musician), member of the Japanese duo Schwarz Stein
 Hora people, an indigenous people of Bolivia

Places
 Hora, Iran, a village in Chaharmahal and Bakhtiari Province, Iran

Music
 Hora (dance), a circle dance originating in the Balkans
 "Hora" (song), 1982 Eurovision contest entry by Avi Toledano

Other
 Hora (astrology), a branch of the Indian system Jyotiṣa
 Hora, any of several Western Classical goddesses,  collectively Horae
 the Latin word for hour, or time
 Dipterocarpus zeylanicus, a tree species commonly known by its anglicized Sinhalese name "hora"
 Hora (2009 film), a 2009 Norwegian exploitation film

See also 
 Horea (disambiguation)
 Horești (disambiguation)